Nordbyen is a satellite town some  north of Nykøbing Falster on the Danish island of Falster. It was formed on 1 January 2007 bringing together the districts of Bangsebro, Møllehave and Stubberup. As of 2022, it has a population of 1,770.

References

Falster
Cities and towns in Region Zealand
Guldborgsund Municipality